Natasha Ambo (born 9 November 1997) is a Papua New Guinean cricketer. In July 2018, she was named in Papua New Guinea's squad for the 2018 ICC Women's World Twenty20 Qualifier tournament.

In April 2019, she was named in Papua New Guinea's squad for the 2019 ICC Women's Qualifier EAP tournament in Vanuatu. She made her Women's Twenty20 International (WT20I) debut for Papua New Guinea against Vanuatu in the Women's Qualifier EAP tournament on 6 May 2019. Later the same day, in Papua New Guinea's next match against Indonesia, she took her first five-wicket haul in WT20Is.

In August 2019, she was named in Papua New Guinea's squad for the 2019 ICC Women's World Twenty20 Qualifier tournament in Scotland. She played in Papua New Guinea's second match of the tournament, on 1 September 2019, against Scotland.

References

External links
 

1997 births
Living people
Papua New Guinean women cricketers
Papua New Guinea women Twenty20 International cricketers
Place of birth missing (living people)